Quebec (AG) v Kellogg's Co of Canada is a leading constitutional decision of the Supreme Court of Canada on the pre-Charter right to freedom of expression. The Quebec Consumer Protection Act, which prohibited advertising to children through cartoons, was challenged by the Kellogg Company on the basis that it affected TV stations across the country. The Court held that the regulation of advertising is a matter within the authority of the province, and that the Act was valid law under the Property and Civil Rights power allocated to the province under section 92(13) of the Constitution Act, 1867.

Reasons of the court
Justice Martland found that the pith and substance of the legislation was the regulation of advertising which he identified as a matter allocated to the provincial government under the property and civil rights power. He noted that the regulation of advertising and was also part of a larger provincial scheme of regulating business practices, all of which fell within the purview of the provincial government. The encroachment upon the regulation of broadcasting was found to only be incidental to the primary subject of advertising, and so was valid.

Chief Justice Laskin, in dissent, disagreed with Martland and argued that the regulation must be read down to exclude the regulation of expression. He pointed out how in McKay v. The Queen (1965) the provincial law regulating signs was read down to exclude the regulation of federal voting signs. Likewise, in Johannesson v. West St. Paul (1952) a provincial law that regulated the zoning of aerodromes was not valid as it encroached on federal power to regulate air transportation.

See also
 Irwin Toy Ltd. v. Quebec (Attorney General)
 List of Supreme Court of Canada cases (Laskin Court)
 Kellogg Co. v. National Biscuit Co.

External links

Canadian federalism case law
Supreme Court of Canada cases
Canadian freedom of expression case law
1978 in Canadian case law
Kellogg's
Cereal advertising characters
Canadian television commercials
Advertising and marketing controversies